The 187th New York State Legislature, consisting of the New York State Senate and the New York State Assembly, met from January 7, 1987, to December 31, 1988, during the fifth and sixth years of Mario Cuomo's governorship, in Albany.

Background
Under the provisions of the New York Constitution of 1938 and the U.S. Supreme Court decision to follow the One man, one vote rule, re-apportioned in 1982 by the Legislature, 61 Senators and 150 assemblymen were elected in single-seat districts for two-year terms. Senate and Assembly districts consisted of approximately the same number of inhabitants, the area being apportioned contiguously without restrictions regarding county boundaries.

At this time there were two major political parties: the Democratic Party and the Republican Party. The Conservative Party, the Right to Life Party, the Liberal Party, the New Alliance Party and the Socialist Workers Party also nominated tickets.

Elections
The New York state election, 1986, was held on November 4. Governor Mario Cuomo was re-elected, and Congressman Stan Lundine was elected Lieutenant Governor, both Democrats. The elections to the other three statewide elective offices resulted in the re-election of the three incumbent officeholders: a Republican Comptroller, a Democratic Attorney General and a Republican U.S. Senator. The approximate party strength at this election, as expressed by the vote for Governor, was: Democrats 2,655,000; Republicans 1,212,000; Conservatives 152,000; Right to Life 131,000; Liberals 120,000; New Alliance 24,000. The Socialist Workers' candidate for U.S. Senator polled about 7,300 votes.

21 of the 24 women members of the previous legislature—State Senators Mary B. Goodhue (Rep.), a lawyer of Mount Kisco; Nancy Larraine Hoffmann (Dem.), of Syracuse; Olga A. Méndez (Dem.), of East Harlem; Velmanette Montgomery (Dem.), of Brooklyn; and Suzi Oppenheimer (Dem.), of Mamaroneck; and Assemblywomen Elizabeth Connelly (Dem.), of Staten Island; Pinny Cooke (Rep.), of Rochester; Geraldine L. Daniels (Dem.), of the Bronx; Gloria Davis (Dem.), of the Bronx; Eileen C. Dugan (Dem.), of Brooklyn; Aurelia Greene (Dem.), of the Bronx; Rhoda S. Jacobs (Dem.), of Brooklyn; Cynthia Jenkins (Dem.), a librarian of Queens; Gerdi E. Lipschutz (Dem.), of Queens; Helen M. Marshall (Dem.), a teacher and librarian of Queens; Nettie Mayersohn (Dem.), of Queens; Mary M. McPhillips (Dem.), of Middletown; Catherine Nolan (Dem.), of Queens; Barbara Patton (Dem.), a lawyer of Hempstead; Toni Rettaliata (Rep.), of Huntington; and Helene Weinstein (Dem.), a lawyer of Brooklyn—were re-elected. Barbara M. Clark (Dem.), of Queens, was also elected to the Assembly.

On April 28, 1987, Audrey Pheffer (Dem.), of Queens, was elected to fill the vacancy in the Assembly caused by the resignation of Gerdi E. Lipschutz.

On June 16, 1987, Patricia McGee (Rep.), of Franklinville, was elected to fill a vacancy in the Assembly.

The New York state election, 1987, was held on November 3. Assemblywoman Toni Rettaliata (Rep.) was elected as Supervisor of the Town of Huntington.

On March 15, 1988, Earlene Hill Hooper (Dem.), of Hempstead, was elected to fill the vacancy in the Assembly caused by the appointment of Barbara Patton to the NYS Workers' Compensation Board. Thus a total of 25 women were members of this Legislature, but not more than 23 at the same time.

Sessions
The Legislature met for the first regular session (the 210th) at the State Capitol in Albany on January 7, 1987; and recessed indefinitely in the morning of July 11.

Mel Miller (Dem.) was elected Speaker of the Assembly.

Warren M. Anderson (Rep.) was re-elected Temporary President of the Senate.

The Legislature met for the second regular session (the 211th) at the State Capitol in Albany on January 6, 1988; and recessed indefinitely in the morning of August 25.

The Legislature met again from November 28, to December 1, 1988. This session was called, among other issues, to consider legislation concerning the Shoreham Nuclear Power Plant.

The Legislature met again on December 28, 1988, to increase the salaries of the next session's state legislators, and the state commissioners.

State Senate

Senators
The asterisk (*) denotes members of the previous Legislature who continued in office as members of this Legislature. Nicholas A. Spano and Randy Kuhl changed from the Assembly to the Senate.

Note: For brevity, the chairmanships omit the words "...the Committee on (the)..."

Employees
 Secretary: Stephen F. Sloan

State Assembly

Assembly members
The asterisk (*) denotes members of the previous Legislature who continued in office as members of this Legislature.

Note: For brevity, the chairmanships omit the words "...the Committee on (the)..."

Employees
 Clerk: Francine Misasi

Notes

Sources
 Balloting for State Senate: New York's 61 Districts in The New York Times on November 6, 1986
 Vote Totals for Races in the New York State Assembly in The New York Times on November 6, 1986
 Democrats Take Assembly Seats In 4 of 5 Races by Frank Lynn, in The New York Times on March 16, 1988

187
1987 in New York (state)
1988 in New York (state)
1987 U.S. legislative sessions
1988 U.S. legislative sessions